Gloxinia perennis is a species of tropical rhizomatous herbaceous flowering plant belonging to the family Gesneriaceae. It is sometimes known as "Canterbury bells" (not to be confused with members of the genus Campanula, which go by the same name).

Etymology
The genus name commemorate Benjamin Peter Gloxin (1765-1795), a German physician and botanical writer. The species epithet perennis, meaning "perennial," was meant to distinguish it from the annual Martynia annua, as the species was first placed in the genus Martynia.

Description
Gloxinia perennis has a raceme-like flowering stem. The flowers are showy, bell-shaped, nodding, pale purple or violet-lavender, mint-scented, about 4 cm long. The stem is erect, glabrous and reaches a height of about 60–120 cm. The leaves are opposite, glabrous and veined. The flowering period extended from mid Summer until early Fall. Fruits are ovoid to elliptical capsules, containing numerous minute seeds. This plant has scaly underground rhizomes.

Distribution
This species has a wide range in Central and South America, from Costa Rica up to Colombia, Brazil and Peru. It is primarily found in the Andes of South America, while  it has probably escaped from cultivation in Central America and the West Indies. Its exact original range is unknown.

Habitat
Gloxinia perennis prefers shady and humid places and grows in forests, on rocks and river banks.

References

Biolib
Global species
Genera gesneriaceae

External links
Brazil Plants

Gesnerioideae
Plants described in 1753
Taxa named by Carl Linnaeus